Oh Madeline is an American sitcom television series starring Madeline Kahn that aired on ABC from September 27, 1983 to March 13, 1984. It was based on the British sitcom Pig in the Middle that aired on ITV from 1980 until 1983.

Overview
The show revolves around Madeline Wayne, a housewife bored after 10 years of marriage to Charlie, a sweet but square man who made his living writing steamy romance novels under the name Crystal Love. Madeline's best friend was Doris, a timid divorcee previously married to Charlie's best friend, a middle-aged swinger named Bob. Annie was Charlie's amorous editor.

Madeline, bored with her predictable, sedate existence in a middle-class suburb, and wanting to put some zest back in into her life, decides to try every trendy diversion that she can find - such as seaweed-based health foods, exercise clubs, and "ladies only" clubs featuring male strippers.

The show contained a lot of slapstick comedy, as well as marital misunderstandings in the tradition of I Love Lucy. The show is notable as the first television show produced by Carsey-Werner Productions, which would go on to produce numerous sitcoms with comedians as leads over the next several decades. Kahn would work with Carsey-Werner again on Cosby (which was also based on a British sitcom One Foot in the Grave) in 1996 until her death in 1999.

Cast
Madeline Kahn - Madeline Wayne
James Sloyan - Charlie Wayne
Louis Giambalvo - Robert Leone
Jesse Welles - Doris Leone
Francine Tacker - Annie McIntyre
Randee Heller - Faye

US ratings

Episodes

Syndication
Oh Madeline briefly aired on USA Network in the early 1990s.

Awards and nominations
Kahn was nominated for a Golden Globe Award for Best Actress in a Comedy Series in 1984, losing to Joanna Cassidy for the series Buffalo Bill.

References

External links
 Oh Madeline @ Carsey-Werner.net (en)
 Carsey Werner - Oh Madeline
 

1983 American television series debuts
1984 American television series endings
1980s American sitcoms
American Broadcasting Company original programming
English-language television shows
American television series based on British television series
Television series by Carsey-Werner Productions
Television shows set in Chicago